Dexter is an unincorporated community in Union Township, Perry County, in the U.S. state of Indiana.

History
A post office was established at Dexter in 1870, and remained in operation until it was discontinued in 1948.

Geography

References

Unincorporated communities in Perry County, Indiana
Unincorporated communities in Indiana